Haidar Nasir Abdulshaheed also known as Haider Jabreen,  (born 13 January 1981 in Najaf) is an Iraqi discus thrower. He competed for Iraq at the 2008 Summer Olympics in Beijing. He was one of only four competitors on the 2008 Iraqi Olympic team.

He was eleventh at the 2006 Asian Games, fourth in the discus at the 2009 Asian Athletics Championships, and seventh at the 2010 Asian Games. He participated at the 2009 World Championships in Athletics, but failed to record a mark.

Achievements

References

External links

1981 births
Living people
Iraqi male discus throwers
Olympic athletes of Iraq
Athletes (track and field) at the 2008 Summer Olympics
Athletes (track and field) at the 2006 Asian Games
Athletes (track and field) at the 2010 Asian Games
Asian Games competitors for Iraq